Bibiana (French: Bibiane) is a comune (municipality) in the Metropolitan City of Turin in the Italian region Piedmont, located about  southwest of Turin.

Bibiana borders the following municipalities: Bricherasio, Luserna San Giovanni, Cavour, Campiglione-Fenile, Lusernetta, and Bagnolo Piemonte.

In 2019, it becomes famous as the location of a Franco-Italian wedding.

References

External links
 Official website  

Cities and towns in Piedmont